Iyyanki Venkata Ramanayya or Ayyanki Venkata Ramanaiah (24 July 1890 – 1979) has been called the "Architect of the Public Library Movement in India". He is the first Indian to be awarded the Kaula Gold Medal. Through his career as an influential library leader, Ramanayya was seen as a respected peer and mentor by S. R. Ranganathan.

Early career 
Iyyanki Venkata Ramanayya was born in Konkuduru village, Ramachandrapuram taluk,  in East Godavari district, Andhra Pradesh, to Venkata Ratnam and Mangamamba. He studied in Tailor High School.

Influenced by Bipin Chandra Pal, Ramanayya entered public life in 1907 at the age of 19. He was instrumental in establishing the First State Library Association in Indian – Andhra Pradesh Library Association (1914) and the Bengal Library Association (1925). He contributed to the foundation of the Madras Library Association (1928) and the Punjab Library Association (1929) at state level and the All India Public Library Association (1919) at the national level.

Between 1934–1948, Ramanayya toured the coastal districts of Andhra Pradesh and organised large-scale library tours. As a result, hundreds of libraries were opened and many others reopened. He organised training camps for the library secretaries in 1920 and 1934.

Accomplishments 
Ramanayya never worked as a librarian in the technical sense but he founded thousands of public libraries throughout India, and South India in particular.    P. Ramachandra Rao describes the Andhra Pradesh library movement; 

Ramanayya founded literary journals such as Andhra Bharati (1910), the first Telugu-language illustrated monthly, which informed people of Telugu related information. He also founded Grandhalaya Sarvaswam in Telugu in 1916, being the first professional journal on Library Science from Vijayawada, as well as the Indian Library Journal in 1924, which was the first professional journal on Library Science published in English from Vijayawada.

He helped establishment of Raja Rammohan Library in 1911 in Vijayawada. He started All India Citizens' Library Association in 1919.

Other works 
Ramanayya organised hundreds of meetings and conferences at the national and state levels. People such as Rabindranath Tagore, P C Roy, and Chittaranjan Das were reception committee chairmen or presidents of different All India Public Library Conferences organised by him in various parts of India. He was the first secretary of the Andhra Pradesh Library Association along with N. Krishna Rad in 1914, as well as the All India Public Library Association which started in 1919.

A Shiva temple, known as Ganga Parwatavardhani sameta Sri Ramalingeswara Swamy, exists because of him.

Legacy and awards 
The Indian movement to build libraries in several states and in the rural, less accessible areas, can be attributed to Ramanayya's organising capacity, energy and dedication. In addition to the Kaula Gold Medal, he was honoured with the award of "Granthalaya Pitamaha" by the Maharajah of Baroda. The Government of India honoured him with the Padmashri award.

He was secretary Andhra Pradesh Library Association and organised an All India Library Meeting on 12 November 1912 in Madras. This meeting lead to the forming of Indian Library Association.

References 

People from East Godavari district
Indian librarians
1890s births
1979 deaths
Telugu people
Recipients of the Padma Shri in social work
Social workers from Andhra Pradesh
20th-century Indian linguists
Scholars from Andhra Pradesh
Social workers